The Nevada—California—Oregon Railway Co. Depot, commonly known as the N.C.O. Depot or The Whistle Stop, is a historic site in Alturas, California, listed on the National Register of Historic Places. It was built 1908 to serve as the passenger station for Alturas on the Nevada–California–Oregon Railway. It has been home to the Alturas Garden Club since at least 1962.

History
In 1880, the Nevada and Oregon Railroad was founded; it was sold in 1884 and renamed the Nevada–California–Oregon Railway (N.C.O.). N.C.O. began regular rail service for Alturas on December 1, 1908. The N.C.O. depot was initially located at the intersection of Twelfth and Oak Streets, near the railyard, but was disassembled and moved, stone by stone, to its current location in 1915 to be closer to the central business district of Alturas.

In 1926, the Southern Pacific Transportation Company purchased the N.C.O., converting the line to standard gauge starting in 1927. Passenger service to Alturas was discontinued on January 1, 1938, and the depot was converted for use as railroad crew housing. The Alturas Garden Club acquired the depot in 1962.

Design

The depot was constructed from stone blocks from a local quarry and is placed with its longest side parallel to the railroad tracks. The eastern facade, which overlooks the tracks, has a centrally-located operator's bay, with the former baggage room to the north and the former waiting room to the south. It is largely unmodified from its days as a passenger depot, and is built in the late Queen Anne style, with an appearance more in common with contemporary stations in the eastern United States than other stations in California.

See also

National Register of Historic Places listings in Modoc County, California

References

Bibliography

External links

 
 
 

Commercial buildings on the National Register of Historic Places in California
Commercial buildings completed in 1908
Queen Anne architecture in California
Transportation buildings and structures in Modoc County, California
National Register of Historic Places in Modoc County, California
Railway stations on the National Register of Historic Places in California